Rhyssella is a genus of ichneumon wasps in the family Ichneumonidae. There are about 10 described species in Rhyssella.

Species
These 10 species belong to the genus Rhyssella:
 Rhyssella approximator (Fabricius, 1793) c g
 Rhyssella brevivaginata Wang & Hu, 1992 c g
 Rhyssella furanna (Matsumura, 1912) c g
 Rhyssella humida (Say, 1835) c g b
 Rhyssella jilinensis Wang & Hu, 1992 c g
 Rhyssella nitida (Cresson, 1864) c g b
 Rhyssella obliterata (Gravenhorst, 1829) c g
 Rhyssella perfulva Porter, 2002 c g
 Rhyssella speciosa Wang & Hu, 1992 c g
 Rhyssella wenxianensis Hu & Yao, 1998 c g
Data sources: i = ITIS, c = Catalogue of Life, g = GBIF, b = Bugguide.net

References

Further reading

External links

 

Parasitic wasps
Ichneumonidae